The Golden Decoration of the Eagle (formerly known as the Golden Medal of the Eagle) is an honorary decoration of the Republic of Albania given to Albanian and foreign citizens for bravery in armed war and for activities or acts of civic courage in peacetime.  
The decoration is awarded by decree of the President of the Republic. This order is golden.

Recipients 
 Oso Kuka
 Sejfi Vllamasi
 Aleksandër Peçi
 Dritan Demiraj
 Hüseyin Kıvrıkoğlu
 İlker Başbuğ
 Charles Bennet

See also
Orders, decorations and medals of Albania

References

Awards established in 1996
Decoration